Casnigo is a comune (municipality) in the Province of Bergamo in the Italian region of Lombardy, located about  northeast of Milan and about  northeast of Bergamo.  

Casnigo borders the following municipalities: Gandino, Cazzano Sant'Andrea, Vertova, Colzate, Ponte Nossa, Cene, Gorno, Fiorano al Serio.

Culture
The city council of Casnigo has claimed the title "homeland of the Baghèt" (the Lombardy bagpipe), as the last traditional player of the instrument was the local Giacomo Ruggeri Casnigo (1905–1990).

References

External links
 Official website